Avannaa, originally Nordgrønland ("North Greenland"), was one of the three counties of Greenland, until 31 December 2008. The county seat was at the main settlement, Qaanaaq.

It was one of the least-densely-populated administrative divisions in the world, with 843 people living in 106,700 km2 of ice-free land for a density of 0.0079 people per square kilometre. The total land area including the land covered by the ice cap is over 500,000 km2. North Greenland has a higher portion of ice-free land than most other areas of the country because much of the extreme north, such as Peary Land, is largely ice-free due to its low precipitation.

The county was also sometimes known as Avannaarsua or Avanersuaq.

Former local divisions 
Qaanaaq municipality, created 1 January 1963
Thule Air Base (Pituffik) (unincorporated), an enclave surrounded by Qaanaaq Municipality (never part of Qaanaaq Municipality)
Northeast Greenland National Park (northern part, since 1988 taken away from Qaanaaq Municipality, to enlarge the existing National Park) (unincorporated)

Local occupations 
Seal hunting is the most important source of income for a large part of the population, and this is why the settlements here are different from those in the rest of Greenland. There are many settlements in the region, and the way of life is different from the one in busier Greenlandic towns. During the winter, when the fjords freeze over, the dog sled is a commonly used means of transport for the fishermen and hunters.

Wildlife 
Land animals are limited to small mammals such as foxes or hares, but air and sea life are plentiful. There are many species of gull, and large numbers of fulmars are often seen close to towns where they make use of waste products from the fish factories. Prawns, which are among Greenland's top exports, are the reason for many large trawlers and smaller fishing vessels which ply the waters of North Greenland. Also commonly seen is the gigantic fin whale.

References

See also 
North Greenland, a former colonial division of Greenland with the same English name
Peary Land
Subdivisions of Norden
Administrative divisions of Greenland
Thule

Counties of Greenland
States and territories disestablished in 2008
2008 disestablishments in Greenland